Nāālehu is a community in Hawaii County, Hawaii, United States.  is Hawaiian for "the volcanic ashes". It is one of the southernmost communities with a post office in the 50 states of the United States. (See List of extreme points of the United States.) For statistical purposes, the United States Census Bureau has defined Naalehu as a census-designated place (CDP). The census definition of the area may not precisely correspond to local understanding of the area with the same name. The population was 866 at the 2010 census, down from 919 at the 2000 census.

Geography
Nāālehu is located near the southern tip of the island of Hawaii at  (19.065925, -155.587528) in the Kaū District. It is bordered to the west by Waiohinu, and Discovery Harbour is to the southwest. (The two communities are census-designated places but do not have post offices.)

Demographics

As of the census of 2000, there were 919 people, 290 households, and 209 families residing in the CDP. The racial makeup of the CDP was 8.38% White, 0.33% African American, 0.11% Native American, 45.59% Asian, 13.82% Pacific Islander, 0.33% from other races, and 31.45% from two or more races. Hispanic or Latino of any race were 5.44% of the population.

There were 290 households, out of which 31.7% had children under the age of 18 living with them, 54.1% were married couples living together, 11.0% had a female householder with no husband present, and 27.9% were non-families. 25.9% of all households were made up of individuals, and 12.1% had someone living alone who was 65 years of age or older.  The average household size was 3.17 and the average family size was 3.77.

In the CDP the population was spread out, with 30.6% under the age of 18, 7.7% from 18 to 24, 23.4% from 25 to 44, 21.8% from 45 to 64, and 16.5% who were 65 years of age or older.  The median age was 36 years. For every 100 females, there were 96.8 males.  For every 100 females age 18 and over, there were 96.3 males.

The median income for a household in the CDP was $31,750, and the median income for a family was $36,964. Males had a median income of $23,625 versus $20,125 for females. The per capita income for the CDP was $11,755.  20.4% of the population and 16.8% of families were below the poverty line.  Out of the total population, 22.0% of those under the age of 18 and 6.6% of those 65 and older were living below the poverty line.

Points of interest
Nāālehu is home to one of several ground communication stations operated by Bigelow Aerospace that is used to communicate with its space modules in orbit. The southernmost church in the United States is Lighthouse Baptist Church.

Notable residents
Shigeo Kikuchi, Buddhist missionary and memoirist

Climate

Gallery

References

External links

Census-designated places in Hawaii County, Hawaii
Populated places on Hawaii (island)
Populated coastal places in Hawaii